Robert Chukuma Iwuchukwu  (born August 1, 1983) is a former American football linebacker. He was originally signed by the New Orleans Saints in 2006. He played collegiately at Purdue.

High school career
Iwuchukwu was ranked the No. 94 overall in Southwest by Prep Football Report and was a two-year letterman at James Martin High School in Arlington, Texas. He was limited to five games as senior due to high ankle sprain.

Iwuchukwu also participated in track and field, was a National Merit Scholar, a two-year selection to Who's Who of America's High School Athletics, and recipient of UTA Summer Science Institute Award for Excellence in Physics.

College career

2002
After being redshirted in 2001, Iwuchukwu appeared in all 13 games as reserve and on special teams in 2002. He had four solo tackles, including one for loss, and led the team with three blocked kicks. He blocked a field goal at Notre Dame, an extra point at Michigan State and another field goal against Washington in the Sun Bowl.

2003
Iwuchukwu appeared in all 13 games as reserve and on special teams in 2003, amassing 14 tackles (8 solo, 6 assists) and a blocked kick. He blocked a 41-yard field goal attempt by Mike Nugent at Ohio State as time expired to send game into overtime. Iwuchukwu also had three tackles (1 solo, 2 assists) in that game. He recorded a season-high five tackles (all solo) against Georgia in the Capital One Bowl after replacing the injured Gilbert Gardner.

2004
In 2004, Iwuchukwu received the team's Most Improved Award for his defensive play in the spring. He started first eight games before suffering season-ending knee injury, yet ranked second on team with two blocked kicks. He also had 40 tackles (20 solo, 20 assists), including four for loss and 0.5 sacks, with one pass breakup and one fumble recovered. In a game against Illinois, he had a career-high 13 tackles (6 solo, 7 assists), including career-high tying 1.5 for loss, recovered fumble and blocked field goal. Iwuchukwu also blocked field goal at Notre Dame.

2005
As a senior in 2005, Iwuchukwu battled injuries and missed four of the team's 12 games. He finished the season with 27 tackles (18 solo), 4.5 tackles for loss, and one sack. He had a season high six tackles against Notre Dame, while his lone sack came against Wisconsin.

Tied for Purdue career lead with five blocked field goals (also Rosevelt Colvin, 1995–98). Iwuchukwu's six blocked kicks overall (also one extra point) are best in school history.

Professional career
At Purdue's Pro Day in March 2006, Iwuchukwu ran the 40-yard dash in 4.49 and 4.51 seconds. He also had a 35-inch vertical jump, 4.30 short shuttle, 11.81 long shuttle, 7.11 three-cone drill and 26 bench presses.

2006
After going undrafted in the 2006 NFL Draft, Iwuchukwu signed a contract with the New Orleans Saints as an undrafted free agent on May 1. He was waived by the team on August 2, then signed by the San Francisco 49ers a week later when linebacker Andre Torrey tore his ACL.

Iwuchukwu attended training camp with the 49ers but was released during final cutdowns on September 2. He was added to the team's practice squad the following day, but released some time later.  He was subsequently was signed to the Ravens practice squad, though was not re-signed after the team's playoff loss to the Indianapolis Colts.

2007
On February 6, 2007, Iwuchukwu signed a future contract with the Miami Dolphins. He was subsequently released on May 1.

Family
Has a youngest sister, Jacque Iwuchukwu (born October 18, 1984), who is a four-time Southland Conference-winning triple jumper. She is an alumnus of Texas State University.

References

External links
 Purdue profile

1983 births
Living people
American football linebackers
American people of Igbo descent
Igbo sportspeople
American sportspeople of Nigerian descent
Miami Dolphins players
Purdue Boilermakers football players
Sportspeople from Arlington, Texas
Players of American football from Texas